This is a list of the governors of the province of Takhar, Afghanistan.

Governors of Takhar Province

See also
 List of current governors of Afghanistan

Notes

Takhar